Giraldi is a surname, and may refer to:
 Bob Giraldi (born 1939), an American film and television director
 Dez Giraldi (born 1986), an Australian soccer player
 Franco Giraldi (1931–2020), an Italian film director
 Giglio Gregorio Giraldi (1479–1552), an Italian scholar and poet
 Giovanni Battista Giraldi, an Italian novelist and poet
 Guglielmo Pecori Giraldi (1856–1941), an Italian Field Marshal
 Orazio Giraldi (died 1617), a Roman Catholic prelate
 Philip Giraldi, a former CIA agent
 Ubaldo Giraldi (1692–1775), an Italian canonist

See also
 Giraldii